The 1996 Big Sky Conference men's basketball tournament was held March 7–9 at Brick Breeden Fieldhouse at Montana State University in Bozeman, Montana.

Top-seeded host  defeated defending champion  in the championship game,  for their second Big Sky men's basketball tournament title.

Format
Conference membership remained with the same eight teams, and no changes were made to the existing tournament format. The top six teams from the regular season participated, and the top two earned byes into the semifinals. The remaining four played in the quarterfinals, and the top seed met the lowest remaining seed in

Bracket

NCAA tournament
Montana State received the automatic bid to the NCAA tournament; no other Big Sky members were invited, or to the NIT. Seeded thirteenth in the West regional, the Bobcats fell  to Syracuse in the first round in Albuquerque.

See also
Big Sky Conference women's basketball tournament

References

Big Sky Conference men's basketball tournament
Tournament
Big Sky Conference men's basketball tournament
Big Sky Conference men's basketball tournament
Basketball competitions in Montana
Sports in Bozeman, Montana
College sports tournaments in Montana